Henry Wade Rogers (October 15, 1853 – August 16, 1926) was a United States circuit judge of the United States Court of Appeals for the Second Circuit.

Education and career

Born on October 10, 1853, in Holland Patent, New York, Rogers received a Bachelor of Arts degree in 1874 from the University of Michigan, a Master of Arts degree in 1877 from the same institution and read law in 1877. He entered practice in Minnesota in 1877 and remained in private practice in New Jersey until 1882. He was the Tappan Professor of Law at the University of Michigan from 1882 to 1886. He was Dean of the Law Department at the University of Michigan from 1886 to 1890. He was President of Northwestern University from 1890 to 1900. He was a faculty member at Yale Law School from 1900 to 1916, as a lecturer from 1900 to 1901, as a Professor from 1901 to 1920 and as Dean from 1903 to 1916.

Federal judicial service

Rogers was nominated by President Woodrow Wilson on September 18, 1913, to a seat on the United States Court of Appeals for the Second Circuit vacated by Judge Walter Chadwick Noyes. He was confirmed by the United States Senate on September 29, 1913, and received his commission the same day. He was a member of the Conference of Senior Circuit Judges (now the Judicial Conference of the United States) from 1922 to 1925. His service terminated on August 16, 1926, due to his death in Pennington, New Jersey.

Family
Rogers married author and suffragist Emma Ferdon Winner in 1876.

References

Sources
 
 Henry Wade Rogers Papers, Northwestern University Archives, Evanston, Illinois

1853 births
1926 deaths
People from New York (state)
University of Michigan alumni
Minnesota lawyers
New Jersey lawyers
Judges of the United States Court of Appeals for the Second Circuit
Presidents of Northwestern University
United States court of appeals judges appointed by Woodrow Wilson
20th-century American judges
Deans of Yale Law School
Deans of University of Michigan Law School
Yale Law School faculty